Eyedentity Games, Inc. is a South Korean developer of online games founded in 2007. The studio's first game is the commercially successful fast-paced action MMORPG, Dragon Nest. Eyedentity Games was acquired by Chinese digital entertainment company Shanda Games in September 2010.

The studio also released a Diablo-like Chibi-Styled action MMORPG in 2012, titled Dungeon Strikers following Dragon Nest's success. The game is currently in Open-Beta in Korea and rights have sold to Game Flier for distribution in Taiwan, Hong Kong and Macau.

Controversy
In April 2018, Eyedentity Games staff members were arrested for withholding overtime payment.

References

South Korean companies established in 2007
Companies based in Seoul
Video game companies of South Korea